The Rocky Mountains Forest Reserve is a tract of land owned by the government of Canadian province of Alberta (called "Crown land") along the eastern slopes and foothills of the Albertan section of the Canadian Rockies.  It is a long strip of land just east of the more famous Canadian Rocky Mountain parks, which is managed for industrial and economic goals, rather than aesthetic and conservation goals as in the parks.

The area had been recommended for protection as early as 1896 when S. Dennis, the chief inspector of surveys for Department of the Interior, wrote a letter to the secretary of the department, stating that "the permanency of our water supply is largely dependent upon the preservation of the forests at present covering the watershed, and this protection can only be secured by prohibiting the cutting of the timber."  Surveyor William Pearce was an early and influential advocate of preserving the region, and convinced the government to set aside a large part of the region from the agricultural settlement occurring elsewhere in the Canadian West.  His continued efforts persuade the Canadian government, in 1902, to enlarge adjacent Rocky Mountain Park (later Banff National Park) to  twice its modern size.  The Rocky Mountains Forest Reserve was first created in 1910 by the federal government of Canada by privy council order #939 to protect the headwaters of the rivers which supply most of the Canadian prairies with fresh water.  Since its inception the area has always been managed to allow industrial activity, particularly logging and mining, with must less importance placed on recreational or conservation uses, in contrast to the neighbouring national parks.  Nevertheless, water has been a recurring theme, with the protection of the headwaters always being the stated priority of government agencies.  A 1911 report on the area by the Department of the Interior describes it as  

The size and shape of the reserve changed repeatedly and dramatically in its early years.  In its original configuration in 1910 the forest reserve constituted two disconnected pieces of land, neither of which are part of the modern reserve: the more northerly part was north of Jasper National Park (today the Willmore Wilderness) and the southerly section was between Jasper Park and Rocky Mountain Park (today the northern third of Banff National Park).  In 1911, Jasper and Rocky Mountain parks were reduced in size and the land transferred to the Rocky Mountains Forest Reserve.  The reserve was expanded eastwards in 1913.  In 1917 Rocky Mountain Park  and in 1927 Jasper Park were greatly expanded at the expense of the reserve.   In 1929 and 1930, the park boundaries were adjusted slightly giving the Kananaskis valley back to the reserve.  With the passage of the Alberta Natural Resources Act, 1930 management of the parks and reserve became separated as all public lands (outside of national parks and military bases) in Alberta were transferred from the federal to the provincial government, including the reserve.  Water management was still a shared responsibility until the 1970s, however.

In 1948, the province designated all of its forested lands the "Green Area", including the eastern slopes.  The provincial government did not enact legislation to formalize its management of the region as a forest reserve until the Forest Reserves Act of 1964, which provides "for the maintenance of water supply and the conservation of forests and other vegetation."  Since the provincial government acquired the reserve, its area has slowly been reduced as other land-use regimes have been established in various smaller parcels of the land, such as the Willmore Wilderness Park established 1950s, the three strict wilderness areas (Ghost River, Siffleur, and White Goat) established in the 1960s, the Kananaskis Country parks system established in the 1970s, and the numerous small parks and recreation areas along the David Thompson corridor established over several decades.  In 1979 the McLean Creek watershed, along with the Ghost–Waiparous farther north, were designated Forest Land-Use Zones (FLUZes) where off-road vehicles (ORVs) are permitted, and since that time ORV use in the area has expanded dramatically, causing groups such as the Ghost River Watershed Alliance and the public at large to express concern about stream-bed erosion and other disturbances.

References

Alberta's Rockies
Forests of the Rocky Mountains
Forests of Alberta
Land management
Hills of Alberta
Government of Alberta
Protected areas of the Rocky Mountains
Forest conservation
Protected areas of Alberta